Haji Mohammed Ayub (born April 15, 1984) is a citizen of China, who was held in extrajudicial detention in the United States Guantanamo Bay detention camps, in Cuba.
The Department of Defense reports he was born on April 15, 1984, in Toqquztash, China.

Ayub is one of approximately two dozen detainees from the Uyghur ethnic group.

Ayub was one of the five Uyghurs whose Combatant Status Review Tribunal determined that he was not an enemy combatant and was transferred to an Albanian refugee camp.

McClatchy interview
On June 15, 2008, the McClatchy News Service published articles based on interviews with 66 former Guantanamo captives.  McClatchy reporters interviewed Mohammed Ayub.
Mohammed Ayub told interviewers he found the conditions in Guantanamo so harsh that he dropped from 164 to 105 pounds, and that he was so hungry he was reduced to eating orange peels.
He told interviewers captives were punished harshly for small infractions, like having an extra napkin.

In spite of his treatment in Guantanamo Mohammed Ayub told reporters he would still like to move to the USA.
He has relatives who live in America, and in 2001 he had a student visa for the USA. However, a friend he was traveling with did not, and he decided to postpone his travel until his friend had a visa, too.

Mohammed Ayub described the interrogations the captives went through when Chinese security officials visited Guantanamo as:

Mohammed Ayub said that he and his companion decided to wait for the visa in Afghanistan, where he was mugged, lost his money and identity papers.

See also
Minors detained in the War on Terror
Uyghur detainees at Guantanamo Bay

References

External links 
 Witness - A strange kind of freedom Aljazeera - video
 Escape to Hell - Fleeing China, Landing in Guantanamo Der Spiegel July 14, 2006
 Free and Uneasy. Tale of 5 Muslims: Out of Guantanamo and Into Limbo Cleared by U.S. of Terror Ties, They Won’t Return Home Due to Fear of Punishment. China Demands Repatriation

Chinese extrajudicial prisoners of the United States
Living people
Uyghurs
Guantanamo detainees known to have been released
1984 births
Juveniles held at the Guantanamo Bay detention camp